Clifford "Heathcliff" Johnson, Jr. (born July 22, 1947) is an American former Major League Baseball player who played for the Houston Astros (1972–1977), New York Yankees (1977–1979), Cleveland Indians (1979–1980), Chicago Cubs (1980), Oakland Athletics (1981–82), Toronto Blue Jays (1983–84, 1985–1986) and Texas Rangers (1985). He batted and threw right-handed and split time between catcher, first baseman, and outfielder in the early part of his Major League career before becoming primarily a full-time designated hitter.

Career
As a catcher at San Antonio's Wheatley High School in 1965, Johnson was the 83rd pick in the 1966 baseball draft by the Houston Astros. After six seasons in the minor leagues, he made his major league debut on September 13, 1972, and played for the Astros until partway through the 1977 season, when he was traded to the Yankees.

Johnson was a member of the 1977 and 1978 Yankees World Series championship teams, both over the Los Angeles Dodgers. On April 19, 1979, following a Yankee loss to the Baltimore Orioles, Reggie Jackson started kidding Johnson about his inability to hit Goose Gossage. While Johnson was showering, Gossage insisted to Jackson that he struck out Johnson all the time when he used to face him. When Jackson relayed this information to Johnson upon his return to the locker room, a fight started between Johnson and the pitcher. Gossage tore ligaments in his right thumb and missed three months of the season. Teammate Tommy John called it "a demoralizing blow to the team." Johnson was traded to Cleveland two months after the brawl.

As a member of the Blue Jays in the mid-1980s, Johnson was a fan favorite at Exhibition Stadium until his retirement on September 30, 1986.

In a 15-season major League career, Johnson posted a .258 batting average with 196 home runs and 699 RBI in 1369 games played. Johnson held the MLB record for pinch hit home runs with 20 until he was surpassed by Matt Stairs in 2010.

Personal
Johnson is the brother-in-law of retired Major League left fielder Mike Easler.

References

External links

Cliff Johnson MLB - Baseballbiography.com
Retrosheet
Venezuelan Professional Baseball League statistics

1947 births
Living people
African-American baseball players
American Association (1902–1997) MVP Award winners
American expatriate baseball players in Canada
Baseball players from San Antonio
Chicago Cubs players
Cleveland Indians players
Columbus Astros players
Covington Astros players
Denver Bears players
Florida Instructional League Astros players
Florida Instructional League Senators players
Gold Coast Suns (baseball) players
Houston Astros players
Leones del Caracas players
American expatriate baseball players in Venezuela
Llaneros de Portuguesa players
Major League Baseball designated hitters
New York Yankees players
Oakland Athletics players
Oklahoma City 89ers players
Peninsula Astros players
Raleigh-Durham Triangles players
Texas Rangers players
Toronto Blue Jays players
21st-century African-American people
20th-century African-American sportspeople
Cocoa Astros players